Andrew Keith Malcolm Adam (born September 10, 1957), known as A. K. M. Adam, is a biblical scholar, theologian, author, priest, technologist and blogger. He is Tutor in New Testament and Greek at St. Stephen's House at Oxford University. He is a writer, speaker, voice-over artist, and activist on topics including postmodern philosophy, hermeneutics, education, and the social constitution of meaning.

Biography
Adam received a bachelor's degree from Bowdoin College (1979) majoring in philosophy.  He earned an M.Div. (1986) and S.T.M. (1987) from Yale Divinity School and was ordained as an Episcopal priest. He received a Ph.D. in New Testament from Duke University in 1991, where he developed his thesis, "New Testament Theology and the Problem of Modernity" under Dan O. Via. After receiving his doctorate from Duke, he went to become Assistant Professor of Religious Studies at Eckerd College from 1991 to 1994. He was appointed Assistant Professor of New Testament at Princeton Theological Seminary, where he taught for 5 years (1994–1999). From 1999 to 2008, Adam was Professor of New Testament at Seabury-Western Theological Seminary.

At the end of his time at Seabury Adam completed a one-year appointment as Visiting Professor at Duke University in Durham, North Carolina. In 2009 he moved to Glasgow, Scotland, joining the staff of the University of Glasgow as lecturer in New Testament Studies in September 2009; beginning in Michaelmas 2013, he joined the staff of St Stephen's House, Oxford, as Tutor in New Testament, and Oriel College as College Lecturer in Theology.

Throughout his academic career, Adam has also served the Church as a priest, including the Parish of St. Luke's in Evanston, Illinois, and St. Mary's Cathedral, Glasgow.

Projects and presentations

At the Conference on Theology and Pedagogy, hosted at Garrett-Evangelical Theological Seminary in 2001, he presented "The Disseminary: What Theological Educators Need to Learn from Napster." In October 2003, he presented at BloggerCon on the topics of "Weblogs and Education," and "Weblogs and Spirituality,"  At Ars Electronica 2008 he presented "The Obscure Convergence of Theological Publishing and Technological Innovation".

Works
Adam has published work on theology, hermeneutics, technology, philosophy, truth and meaning, Biblical interpretation, community, digital identity, digital rights, and collaborative spaces in education. His books to date have primarily been concerned with the postmodern implications of understanding and processing the text and meaning of the New Testament.

Thesis

Books
 
 
 
 
 
 .

as Editor

References

External links
 Beautiful Theology blog ended 2011
 Disseminary
 AKMA’s Random Thoughts
 Personal photoblog
 https://web.archive.org/web/20070819185451/http://ecole.evansville.edu/contrib.html#AKMAdam

Living people
1957 births
American Episcopal theologians
American biblical scholars
Writers from Evanston, Illinois
Eckerd College faculty
New Testament scholars
Bowdoin College alumni
Yale Divinity School alumni
Duke Divinity School alumni
American Episcopal priests
Writers from Boston
Academics of the University of Glasgow
Anglican biblical scholars
Postmodernists
20th-century Christian biblical scholars